Once a Rocker, Always a Rocker is the third album by The Joe Perry Project, released in 1983 on MCA Records.

Track listing
All tracks composed by Joe Perry and Mach Bell; except where indicated.
Side one
"Once a Rocker, Always a Rocker" – 2:58 
"Black Velvet Pants" (Perry) – 3:20 
"Women in Chains" (Ronnie Brooks, Harold Tipton, Tom DeLuca) – 4:05 
"Four Guns West" – 4:28 
"Crossfire" – 5:43

Side two
"Adrianna" – 3:20 
"King of the Kings" – 4:02 
"Bang a Gong" (Marc Bolan) – 3:55 (T. Rex cover)
"Walk with Me Sally" – 3:14 
"Never Wanna Stop" – 4:27

Outtakes
"When Worlds Collide"
"First One's for Free"
"Going Down"
"They'll Never Take Me Alive"
"Into the Night"
"Something Else"

"When Worlds Collide" and "Going Down" were often included in setlists of The Joe Perry Project prior to the recording sessions of the album, with "Something Else" performed during the tour for the album.

Alternate song titles
"No Time for Women" -> "Once a Rocker..."
"When Do I Sleep" -> "Adrianna"

Personnel
 Joe Perry – electric and acoustic guitars, lap steel guitar, slide guitar, six-string bass, producer
 "Cowboy" Mach Bell – vocals, percussion
 Danny Hargrove – bass, backing vocals
 Joe Pet – drums, congas, timbales, gong, backing vocals
 Harry King – piano, associate producer
 Mark Parenteau – chains ("Women In Chains")
 Jim Biggins, Rick Cunningham - saxophones

Production
Michael Golub – engineer, associate producer
Ed Goodreau, Meg Bryant – tape operators
Greg Calbi – mastering at Sterling Sound, New York

References

1983 albums
The Joe Perry Project albums
MCA Records albums